The Eóganachta or Eoghanachta were an Irish dynasty centred on Cashel which dominated southern Ireland (namely the Kingdom of Munster) from the 6/7th to the 10th centuries, and following that, in a restricted form, the Kingdom of Desmond, and its offshoot Carbery, to the late 16th century. By tradition the dynasty was founded by Conall Corc but named after his ancestor Éogan, the firstborn son of the semi-mythological 3rd-century king Ailill Aulom. This dynastic clan-name, for it was never in any sense a 'surname,' should more accurately be restricted to those branches of the royal house which descended from Conall Corc, who established Cashel as his royal seat in the late 5th century.

High Kingship issue
Although the Eóganachta were powerful in Munster, they never provided Ireland with a High King. Serious challenges to the Uí Néill were however presented by Cathal mac Finguine and Feidlimid mac Cremthanin. They were not widely recognized as High Kings or Kings of Tara, as they did not belong to the Uí Néill, but they controlled territories as large or larger than those of the other dynasty. The kings of the Hill of Tara were sometimes called High Kings but were not recognized as kings of all Ireland in the historical period. However, this is to put the supposed position of "High King of Ireland" on a platform that it probably never enjoyed. The social structure of Gaelic Ireland was extremely complex, hierarchically oriented and aristocratic in concept. At the summit of society stood the king of a province, variously styled in the law texts as "King of great kings", "Chief of kings" and "The ultimate king of every individual". From his justice there was no appeal, nor did the Brehon Law acknowledge the existence of the High Kingship of Ireland. The ri ruirech had no legal superior. In Munster this legal theory was explicitly adhered to by the annalists who styled the provincial kings as "High King", thereby stressing his absolute sovereignty. As the concept of the High Kingship of Ireland was developed from the 9th century onwards by the Uí Néill clan, the kings of Munster counterbalanced that historically inaccurate doctrine by stressing their alternative right to that title, or instead the enjoyment of full sovereignty in Leth Mogha, that part of Ireland south of a line from Dublin to Galway.

The Eóganacht king Fíngen mac Áedo Duib (Fingin son of Hugh Dubh) ruled as King of Munster (died 618) and is the direct male line ancestor of the O'Sullivans.  His son Seachnasagh was too young to assume the throne and was therefore followed by Eóganacht king of Munster Faílbe Flann mac Áedo Duib, direct male line ancestor of the later MacCarthy kings. In the Roll of "The Kings of Munster", under the heading "Provincial Kings", we find that Fingin, son of Hugh Dubh, is No.14 on the Roll, while his brother Failbhe is No.16. Long, an anglicized version of the name Ó Longaidh, belongs to one of the oldest branches of the Eóghanchta royal dynasty of Ireland's Munster Province. Prince Longaidh, patriarch of the sept living in about 640, was a descendant of Oengus Mac Nad Fróich, the first Christian king of Munster in the 5th century who was said to have been baptized by Ss. Patrick and Ailbe on the Rock of Cashel. Early genealogical heritage survives in a poem attributed to the 7th century entitled Duan Cathain, preserved in An Leabhar Muimhneach. By the time of the Norman invasion in 1066, this Catholic clan was well established in its present territory in the Barony of Muskerry, County Cork, parishes of Canovee, Moviddy, Kilbonane, Kilmurry, and Dunisky straddling the River Lee.
The MacCarthys owed the prominent position they held in Desmond at that period of the English invasion of Ireland, not to primogeniture, but to the disturbed state and chaos of Munster during the Danish wars, in which their immediate ancestors took a prominent and praiseworthy part.<ref>http://www.libraryireland.com/Pedigrees1/Heber.php#1</ref>

Gentle rulers
The rule of the Eóganachta in Munster is widely regarded as gentle and more sophisticated in comparison with the other provincial dynasties of Ireland. Not only was Munster the wealthiest of the provinces, but the Eóganachta were willing to concede other previously powerful kingdoms whom they had politically marginalized, such as the Corcu Loígde, considerable status and freedom from tribute, based on their former status as rulers of the province.

Ancient origins

Their origins, possibly Gaulish, are very obscure.O'Rahilly 1946 According to one of their own origin legends (Laud 610), they were descendants of Heber, eldest son of King Milesius from the north of Spain (modern-day Galicia). The proto-Eóganachta, from the time of Mug Nuadat to the time of Crimthann mac Fidaig and Conall Corc, are sometimes referred to as the Deirgtine in early sources.

The earliest evidence for the proto-Eóganachta, the Deirgthine or Deirgtine, is in the form of ogham inscriptions. They appear to have initially been subjects of the Dáirine, a warlike people with frequently mentioned connections to Ulster, who were possibly cousins of the Ulaid. The Dáirine were represented in historical times most clearly by the Corcu Loígde, over whom the Deirgtine finally achieved supremacy during the 7th century, following the loss by the former of their centuries-long hold on the Kingdom of Osraige, apparently with some outside help from the Uí Néill.

The Eóganachta achieved their status primarily through political and economic sophistication and not military conquest. Ireland was dominated by several hostile powers whom they were never in any position to challenge militarily on their own, in the early centuries, but there also existed a number of subject tribes whom the Deirgtine successfully convinced to adopt them as their overlords. The effect was to separate the Dáirine, by now mainly the Corcu Loígde, from their cousin kingdoms and prominent subjects. The Eóganachta progressively surrounded themselves with favoured vassals such as the Múscraige, who would become the main source of their income as well as defense against the other kingdoms.Duffy 2005 The later famous Déisi Tuisceart, who would produce Brian Bóruma, were among these vassal peoples. The Déisi Muman of County Waterford may have shared Gaulish origins with the Eóganachta themselves.

Another powerful people of early Munster were the Mairtine, who had their capital at Emly or Imlech Ibair, first known as Medón Mairtine. It became the head church of the Eóganachta.

Mythology
See 

Aimend
Áine 
Battle of Mag Mucrama
Leath Mogha
Lugaid mac Con
Mór Muman
Mug Ruith
Nia Segamain
Óengus Bolg
Senchas Fagbála Caisil 

Royal houses, Septs and surnames

Early figures
A number of the figures below may be listed under the wrong septs. The quality of Eóganachta genealogical and historical writing greatly improves in the 2nd millennium under the MacCarthy overlords but some problems remain. The earliest historical rulers from the Eóganachta, descendants of Conall Corc, include:
 Mug Nuadat (Deirgtine)
 Ailill Aulomm
 Éogan Mór
 Fiachu Muillethan
 Ailill Flann Bec
 Luigthech
 Conall Corc (Eóganachta)
 Nad Froích mac Cuirc (Inner Circle)
 Óengus mac Nad Froích, d. 489
 Feidlimid mac Óengusa
 Eochaid mac Óengusa, d. 522
 Ailill mac Nad Froích
 Coirpre Luachra mac Cuirc (Uí Choirpri Lúachra)
 Mac Cass mac Cuirc (Uí Echach Muman)

The princely houses of the Eóganachta may usefully be divided into the inner circle, the outer circle and extinct septs.

Princely houses: inner circle

 Eóganacht Chaisil
 Eóganacht Áine
 Eóganacht Glendamnach

These three princely houses produced nearly all Kings of Cashel from the 5th to the 10th centuries. Some were strong, others were renowned bishops and scholars, and others were weak. The importance of the Cashel kingship was primarily ceremonial, and rulers were with the occasional exception not militarily aggressive, although they continually strove for political dominance as far as they could with the province's wealth. Strong petty kingdoms regarded as subject would receive large payments called rath in return for their acknowledgment of the political supremacy of Cashel, and they would sometimes give hostages as well. The most powerful petty kingdoms exchanged hostages with the King of Cashel, and though subject in some sense (by agreement), they were legally free and capable of terminating the contract.

The Eóganacht Chaisil under the MacCarthys would later form the much more militarily capable but undermanned Kingdom of Desmond. The O'Sullivans, the eldest of the Eóganacht Chaisil, were the most powerful lords under them. The O'Keeffes of Eóganacht Glendamnach would later produce many great soldiers for Irish and Continental armies. The O'Callaghans were a smaller sept who have distinguished themselves in recent times, while the MacAuliffes and MacGillycuddys are, as stated, simply septs of the MacCarthys and O'Sullivans. The O'Kirbys of Eóganacht Áine were ruined by the Norman Invasion of Ireland.
 Eóganacht Chaisil of Cashel (O'Callaghan, MacCarthy, MacGillycuddy, MacAuliffe, O'Sullivan)
 Carthage the Elder
 Fíngen mac Áedo Duib, d. 618
 Faílbe Flann mac Áedo Duib, d. 639
 Máenach mac Fíngin, d. 661
 Colgú mac Faílbe Flaind, d. 678
 Cormac mac Ailello, d. 712
 Tnúthgal mac Donngaile, d. 820
 Feidlimid mac Cremthanin, d. 847
 Áilgenán mac Donngaile, d. 853
 Máel Gualae, d. 859
 Cormac mac Cuilennáin, d. 908 (see also Sanas Cormaic, Cormac's Glossary)
 Cellachán Caisil, d. 954
 Donnchad mac Cellacháin, d. 963
 Eóganacht Glendamnach (O'Keeffe)
 Crimthann Srem mac Echado, d. c. 542
 Coirpre Cromm mac Crimthainn, d. 577
 Cathal mac Áedo, d. 627
 Cathal Cú-cen-máthair, d. 665
 Finguine mac Cathail, d. 696
 Ailill mac Cathail, d. 701
 Cathal mac Finguine, d. 742
 Artrí mac Cathail, d. 821
 Eóganacht Áine (O'Kirby, O'Kirwick/Kerwick)
 Garbán mac Éndai
 Amalgaid mac Éndai, d. 601
 Cúán mac Amalgado, d. 641
 Eterscél mac Máele Umai, d. 721
 Cathussach mac Eterscélai, d. c. 769
 Ólchobar mac Duib-Indrecht, d. 805
 Ólchobar mac Cináeda, d. 851
 Cenn Fáelad hua Mugthigirn, d. 872

Princely houses: outer circle

 Eóganacht Locha Léin
 Eóganacht Raithlind

The two "outer" princely houses of the dynasty dwelt to the west and south of the central dynasties. Though descended from Conall Corc and thus theoretically entitled to hold the kingship, in effect these dynasties were excluded from Cashel politics, a situation which may or may not have been based on geographical realities. Powerful kings could become de facto Kings of Munster, but in general the central dynasties refused to recognize them as such, and this resulted in particular antagonism between Cashel and Eóganacht Locha Léin, the power of which was eventually broken. Eóganacht Raithlind was not as aggressive and so survived under O'Mahony rule well into the 2nd millennium. The O'Donoghues, originally from Eóganacht Raithlind, would move in to become the new princes of Eóganacht Locha Léin, and are still represented among the Irish nobles today by the Lord of Glenflesk (see below).

Oddly enough, the Eóganacht Raithlind, the Eóganacht Locha Léin, and the Uí Fidgenti-Liatháin (below), are all together referred to as the Three Eóganachta of Munster in early medieval story known as The Expulsion of the Déisi.Meyer 1901 This is strange in part because the first two were supposedly descended from Conall Corc and not Dáire Cerbba, but this grouping may be simply meant to illustrate that these were all free tribes in comparison with the rent-paying Déisi. Ongoing DNA analysis of the O'Connells of Kerry would seem to confirm an Eóghanacht origin, most closely related to the O'Donoghues (Eóghanacht Locha Léin), though they are in some sources assigned to the Uí Fidgenti-Liatháin. The Eóganacht Locha Léin were themselves often viewed by the "inner circle" with surprisingly vicious hostility, and this somehow involved a connection to the Picts of Scotland.

The occasional misguided attempts to "rank" these powerful septs "below" those of the inner circle, or even to exclude them from the Eóganachta entirely, can be rejected. See also Iarmuman.

 Eóganacht Locha Léin (O'Moriarity, and others, later O'Donoghue)
 Dauí Iarlaithe mac Maithni
 Áed Bennán mac Crimthainn, d. 618
 Máel Dúin mac Áedo Bennán, d. 661
 Congal mac Máele Dúin, d. 690
 Máel Dúin mac Áedo, d. 786
 Eóganacht Raithlind (O'Mahony, O'Donoghue, O'Long, and many others)
 Feidlimid mac Tigernaig, d. 588
 Máel Muad mac Brain, d. 978 (see also Mathgamain mac Cennétig)

Extinct septs
There are several extinct and/or unconfirmed septs:
 Eóganacht Airthir Cliach (extinct)
 Fergus Scandal mac Crimthainn, d. 582
 Eóganacht Ninussa
 Éoganacht Ua Cathbach

Surnames and clan names
Eóganachta dynastic surnames include O'Callaghan, MacCarthy, O'Donoghue, MacGillycuddy, O'Keeffe, O'Moriarity, O'Sullivan, among others, many of them of contested origin. MacAuliffe is typically a MacCarthy (Cremin) sept. MacGillycuddy is an O'Sullivan (Mor) sept. O'Long is classed as Eóganacht (Raithlind). O'Driscoll is Corcu Loígde (Dáirine) but the family are related to the Eóganachta through early and late marriages and so qualify as natural kin. O'Leary can be either Corcu Loígde or Uí Fidgenti or Eóganacht depending on the sept. O'Carroll of Éile may or may not be distantly related to the Eóganachta. Scannell was also a sept of some significance and it is recorded that in 1014, Eocha, son of Dunadbach, Chief of Clann Scannail, and Scannail son of Cathal, Lord of Eóganacht Locha Léin, were killed at the Battle of Clontarf.T.M.Charles-Edwards, Early Christian Ireland

Out of the approximately 150 surviving Irish surnames of princely or comital origins, the Eóganachta and their allies account for approximately 30, or about one fifth. Unfortunately their pedigrees are often hopelessly disorganized and confused and so it is difficult or impossible to tell in many cases which people belong to which septs, or in fact if they even belong to the Eóganachta at all. There is also great evidence in the pedigrees and regnal lists of repeated modification, outright fabrication, and unceremonious deletion, at least for the early period (all concerned sources), with some criticisms quite severe, although this is also a problem with Connachta and Laigin material.

Eóganachta Kings of Munster

Other kingdoms

In Ireland

Sometimes also included are the Uí Fidgenti (O'Donovan, O'Collins, O'Flannery, Lyons, among others.) and the related Uí Liatháin (Lyons, Gleeson, others), ancient allies of the Eóganachta who may have originally belonged to the Dáirine, although it is also possible they were earlier or peripheral branches of the descendants of Ailill Flann Bec, or of Ailill Aulomm, not involved in the innovative Cashel politics of the descendants of Conall Corc, actual founder of the Eóganachta dynasties. In this way, the children of Fidach, the early monarch Crimthand Mór mac Fidaig and his sister Mongfind, also belong to the peripheral Eóganachta. But only the descendants of Conall Corc, son of Luigdech or Lugaid, son of Ailill Flann Bec, could claim Cashel, whereas all three of these more distantly related aristocracies appear to descend from Dáire Cerbba and/or Maine Munchaín, so-called brother(s) of Lugaid. In any case, both the Uí Fidgenti and Uí Liatháin were apparently fading, for whatever reasons, while the Eóganachta were in their prime. They paid no obvious tribute but were little involved in the political scene after a period, the terms of the alliance being only that they were expected to support the Eóganachta militarily on "honour related" expeditions outside Munster or in the defence of it. The Uí Fidgenti did exchange hostages with the King of Cashel, just like the Eóganacht Raithlind and Eóganacht Locha Léin were honoured, and so they appear to have been viewed as kin from an early period, even if they may have been Dáirine to begin with or included very substantial elements.see also O'Rahilly 1946 In the earliest genealogies, mostly found in Rawlinson B 502, they are in some way kin to the Eóganachta, even if only through marriage at first as suggested by some later interpreters.

According to Rawlinson B 502, Dáire Cerbba was born in Brega, County Meath, but no explanation is given. This might mean his family were even later arrivals to Munster than the Eóganachta and help explain their lack of centralization and well known colonies in Britain. The Uí Fidgenti (NW) and Uí Liatháin (SE) were in opposing corners of Munster with the Eóganacht Áine and Eóganacht Glendamnach more or less in between, as well as the Fir Mag Fene. Brega bordered on the territory of the Laigin, and was originally a part of it. Against this is the fact that the Uí Fidgenti had their own capital at Dún Eochair in Munster, constructed by the Dáirine several centuries before the rise of Cashel, as described by Geoffrey Keating.

In Scotland
 

It has been suggested that the Kings of the Picts were derived from a sept of the Eóganachta. If so, then the Eóganacht Locha Léin, and thus the ancestors of the O'Moriartys and others, are the most obvious candidates. Not only were they at one point expansive as the powerful Kingdom of Iarmuman, but they were also frustrated by their exclusion and forced isolation by the inner circle. The inner circle exhibited peculiar attitudes from time to time and so this could have been the real story.

 Eóganacht Maige Geirginn. The plain of Circinn is thought to be the area of Angus and the Mearns in Scotland.
 Óengus I of the Picts, d. 761
 Bridei V of the Picts
 Talorgan II of the Picts, d. 782
 Drest VIII of the Picts
 Constantín mac Fergusa, d. 820
 Óengus II of the Picts, d. 834
 Drest IX of the Picts, d. 836 or 837
 Eóganan mac Óengusa, d. 839

History

Competition with the Uí Néill
See Byrne (2001), Cathal mac Finguine, Feidlimid mac Cremthanin, Synod of Birr.

Competition with the Dál gCais
In some later traditions of Thomond, Eógan had a younger brother, Cas, who is said to have originated the rival Dál gCais dynasty of Ireland.  The smaller Dál gCais kingdom proved to have surprising military might, and displaced the increasingly beset Eóganachta, who were suffering also from attacks by the Vikings and the Uí Néill, on the Munster throne during the course of the 10th century. From this the Eóganachta and their allies would never fully recover, but they did continue, largely in the form of the MacCarthys and O'Sullivans, to assert their authority and rule large parts of Desmond for the next six centuries. They would badly rout the FitzGeralds at the Battle of Callann, halting the advance of the Normans into Desmond, and win back many territories briefly held by them.
See Byrne (2001), Todd (1867), Brian Bóruma, Mathgamain mac Cennétig, Cennétig mac Lorcáin, Kings of Munster, Kings of Desmond, Thomond, County Clare, Déisi.

The Cambro-Normans and England
See FitzGerald, Battle of Callann, Earl of Desmond, Desmond Rebellions, Second Desmond Rebellion, Florence MacCarthy, Tudor conquest of Ireland, Dónall Cam Ó Súilleabháin Béirre, Siege of Dunboy, Plantations of Ireland, Irish Confederate Wars, Donagh MacCarthy, Viscount Muskerry, Earl of Clancarty.

Ecclesiastical relations with Germany
See Byrne (2001).

Marriages and pedigrees
See O'Hart (1892), Cronnelly (1864), Burke (1976), D'Alton (1861), O'Donovan (1856), O'Keeffe (1703), Byrne (2001).

Later figures

 Charles MacCarthy (Irish soldier)
 Robert MacCarty, Viscount Muskerry
 Charles MacCarthy (governor)

Other notable people are:

 Thaddeus MacCarthy,
 Nicholas Tuite MacCarthy
 Eoghan Rua Ó Súilleabháin

For the 20th century, the long hidden Ó Coileáins of Uí Conaill Gabhra, once the most dominant sept of the Uí Fidgenti, produced the famous Mícheál Ó Coileáin. His sept were driven out of County Limerick in the 13th century by the FitzGeralds, but still regarded themselves as dispossessed aristocracy. The Ó Coileáins had joined their cousins the O'Donovans in County Cork, who themselves had been assisted by their friends the O'Mahonys. The MacCarthy Reaghs would soon follow to become the princes of the area, or Barony of Carbery, and later both they and the O'Mahonys would send septs to be accepted among the aristocracy in France. See also Counts of Toulouse. Of the four, only the O'Donovans, keeping a low profile, remained Gaelic lords after a time.

The MacCarthy of Muskerry dynasty are of great importance and there are several surviving septs.

Daniel "The Liberator" O'Connell has been said to have belonged to a small sept of the Uí Fidgenti who found themselves in County Kerry.Cronnelly 1864

Another lively figure was Pierce Charles de Lacy O'Mahony.

Modern Eóganacht
Curley  gives profiles of some twenty current Irish lords, several of them Eóganacht or allied, enjoying varying levels of recognition.

 O'Donoghue of the Glens (Eóganacht Locha Léin, first Eóganacht Raithlind)
 McGillycuddy of the Reeks (O'Sullivan Mor: Eóganacht Chaisil)
 O'Callaghan of Duhallow (Eóganacht Chaisil)
 O'Donovan of Clancahill (Uí Fidgenti)

The scandal created by Terence Francis MacCarthy has left their futures uncertain. He inserted himself into the pedigree of the Sliocht Cormaic of Dunguile, the senior surviving sept of the MacCarthy dynasty, who still await recognition from the Irish government following the scandal.

See also

 Kingdoms of Ireland
 Kings of Munster
 Kings of Desmond
 Mac Carthaigh's Book
 Counts of Toulouse
 Earl of Clancarty
 Irish nobility
 Family of Barrau
 Irish royal families
 Chief of the Name
 Terence Francis MacCarthy

Notes

References

 Bhreathnach, Edel (ed.), The Kingship and Landscape of Tara. Four Courts Press for The Discovery Programme. 2005. Pages 249, 250 & Historical Early Éoganachta, Table 9, pages 356, 357.
 Bugge, Alexander (ed. and tr.), Caithreim Cellachain Caisil: The Victorious Career of Cellachan of Cashel Christiania: J. Chr. Gundersens Bogtrykkeri. 1905.
 Burke, Bernard and Hugh Montgomery-Massingberd, Burke's Irish Family Records, or Burke's Landed Gentry of Ireland. London: Burke's Peerage Ltd. 5th edition, 1976.
 Byrne, Francis J., Irish Kings and High-Kings. Four Courts Press. 2nd edition, 2001.
 Cairney, C. Thomas, Clans and Families of Ireland and Scotland: An Ethnography of the Gael, A.D. 500-1750. Willow Bend Books. 1989. (elementary popular work)
 Charles-Edwards, T.M., Early Christian Ireland. Cambridge University Press. 2000.
 Coogan, Tim Pat, Michael Collins: The Man Who Made Ireland. Palgrave Macmillan. 2002. (pgs. 5–6)
 Cronnelly, Richard F., Irish Family History Part II: A History of the Clan Eoghan, or Eoghanachts. Dublin: 1864.
 Curley, Walter J.P., Vanishing Kingdoms: The Irish Chiefs and their Families. Dublin: Lilliput Press. 2004.
 D'Alton, John, Illustrations, Historical and Genealogical, of King James's Irish Army List, 1689 2 vols. London: J.R. Smith. 2nd edition, 1861.
 Dillon, Myles, The Cycles of the Kings. Oxford. 1946. (Four Courts Press. Revised edition, 1995.)
 Dillon, Myles, "The Story of the Finding of Cashel", in Ériu 16 (1952): 63.
 Duffy, Seán (ed.), Medieval Ireland: An Encyclopedia. Routledge. 2005.
 Eoghanact Septs DNA Project (http://eoghanachtsepts.com)
 Foster, Roy (ed.), The Oxford Illustrated History of Ireland. Oxford University Press. 2001.
 Hull, Vernan, "Conall Corc and the Corcu Loígde", in Proceedings of the Modern Languages Association of America 62 (1947): 887–909.
 Hull, Vernan, "The Exile of Conall Corc", in Proceedings of the Modern Languages Association of America 56 (1941): 937–50.
 Koch, John T. (ed.), Celtic Culture: A Historical Encyclopedia. 5 volumes or single ebook. ABC-CLIO. 2006.
 Lalor, Brian, The Encyclopedia of Ireland. Yale University Press. 2003.
 MacLysaght, Edward, Irish Families: Their Names, Arms and Origins. Irish Academic Press. 4th edition, 1998.
 Mac Niocaill, Gearóid, Ireland before the Vikings. Dublin: Gill and Macmillan. 1972.
 Meyer, Kuno (ed. and tr.), "The Expulsion of the Dessi", in Y Cymmrodor 14. 1901. pgs. 101–35. (available here)
 Meyer, Kuno (ed.), "The Laud Genealogies and Tribal Histories", in Zeitschrift für Celtische Philologie 8. Halle/Saale, Max Niemeyer. 1912. Pages 291–338.
 O'Connell Surname DNA Project (Results table, particularly the core "Irish Type II" results for SNPs A7659 and A7654: https://www.familytreedna.com/public/oconnelldna?iframe=ycolorized)
 Ó Corráin, Donnchadh, "Corcu Loígde: Land and Families", in Cork: History and Society. Interdisciplinary Essays on the History of an Irish County, edited by Patrick O'Flanagan and Cornelius G. Buttimer. Dublin: Geography Publications. 1993.
 Ó Corráin, Donnchadh (ed.), Genealogies from Rawlinson B 502 University College, Cork: Corpus of Electronic Texts. 1997.
 Ó Corráin, Donnchadh, Ireland before the Normans. Dublin: Gill and Macmillan. 1972.
 Ó Corráin, Donnchadh, "Prehistoric and Early Christian Ireland", in Foster, Roy (ed.), The Oxford Illustrated History of Ireland. Oxford University Press. 2001. pgs. 1-52.
 Ó Cróinín, Dáibhí (ed.), A New History of Ireland: Prehistoric and Early Ireland, Vol. 1. Oxford University Press. 2005.
 O'Donovan, John (ed. and tr.), Annála Ríoghachta Éireann. Annals of the Kingdom of Ireland by the Four Masters, from the Earliest Period to the Year 1616. 7 vols. Royal Irish Academy. Dublin. 1848–51. 2nd edition, 1856.
 O'Hart, John, Irish Pedigrees. Dublin. 5th edition, 1892.
 Ó hInnse, Séamus (ed. and tr.) and Florence MacCarthy, Mac Carthaigh's Book, or Miscellaneous Irish Annals (A.D. 1114-1437). Dublin Institute for Advanced Studies. 1947.
 O'Keeffe, Eugene (ed. and tr.), Eoganacht Genealogies from the Book of Munster. Cork. 1703. (available here)
 O'Rahilly, Thomas F., Early Irish History and Mythology. Dublin Institute for Advanced Studies. 1946.
 Richter, Michael, Medieval Ireland: The Enduring Tradition. Palgrave Macmillan. 1996.
 Sproule, David, "Origins of the Éoganachta", in Ériu 35 (1984): pp. 31–37.
 Sproule, David, "Politics and pure narrative in the stories about Corc of Cashel", in Ériu 36 (1985): pp. 11–28.
 Todd, James Henthorn (ed. and tr.), Cogadh Gaedhel re Gallaibh: The War of the Gaedhil with the Gaill Longmans. 1867.
 Welch, Robert (ed.) with Bruce Stewart, The Oxford Companion to Irish Literature''. Oxford University Press. 1996.

Further reading

External links
 Mumu
 Tuadmumu
 Do bunad imthechta Éoganachta
 Conall Corc 7 Ríge Caisil
 Genemain Chuirc meic Luigdech
 Aided Chrimthainn meic Fhidaig 7 Trí Mac Echach Muigmedóin
 Echtra Mac nEchach Muigmedóin
 Irish Historical Mysteries: The MacCarthy Mór Hoax
 The Eóganacht Septs of Ireland (Y-DNA related)
 Famille MacCarthy Reagh at GeneaWiki (in French)
 Famille O'Mahony at GeneaWiki (in French)
 The MacCarthy Clan Foundation 

 
Kings of Munster
Áine
Gaels